The 2000 United States presidential election in Kentucky took place on November 7, 2000, as part of the 2000 United States presidential election, which included elections in all 50 states and D.C. Voters chose 8 representatives, or electors to the Electoral College, who voted for president and vice president.

Kentucky was won by Governor George W. Bush. He won most of the counties and congressional districts in the state. Bush dominated among the rural areas of the state. The only congressional district Gore won was the third district, which is a part of Jefferson County, Kentucky, the highest populated county in the state. The only other region where Gore performed strongly was in the coal dependent counties in the southeastern part of the state. , this is the last election in which Boyd County, Muhlenberg County, Harlan County, Perry County, Letcher County, Ballard County, and Fulton County voted for the Democratic candidate, and also the first in which Wolfe County and Morgan County ever voted for a Republican.

Kentucky was 1 of 14 states that Bill Clinton won at least once and 1 of 9 that backed him twice that Gore lost, whom at the time of the election was serving as Vice President under Clinton.

Bush became the first Republican to win the White House without carrying Jefferson County since Theodore Roosevelt in 1904.

Results

By county

Counties that flipped from Democratic to Republican
Bath (Largest city: Owingsville)
Bell (Largest city: Middlesboro)
Bourbon (Largest city: Paris)
Caldwell (Largest city: Princeton)
Calloway (Largest city: Murray)
Carlisle (Largest city: Bardwell)
Carroll (Largest city: Carrollton)
Carter (Largest city: Grayson)
Clark (Largest city: Winchester)
Fayette (Largest city: Lexington)
Gallatin (Largest city: Warsaw)
Graves (Largest city: Mayfield)
Greenup (Largest city: Flatwoods)
Hancock (Largest city: Hawesville)
Harrison (Largest city: Cynthiana)
Henry (Largest city: Eminence)
Hickman (Largest city: Clinton)
Hopkins (Largest city: Madisonville)
Johnson (Largest city: Paintsville)
Lawrence (Largest city: Louisa)
Livingston (Largest city: Salem)
Logan (Largest city: Russellville)
Lyon (Largest city: Eddyville)
Magoffin (Largest city: Salyersville)
Marion (Largest city: Lebanon)
Marshall (Largest city: Benton)
Martin (Largest city: Inez)
McCracken (Largest city: Paducah)
McLean (Largest city: Livermore)
Meade (Largest city: Brandenburg)
Menifee (Largest city: Frenchburg)
Montgomery (Largest city: Mount Sterling)
Morgan (Largest city: West Liberty)
Nelson (Largest city: Bardstown)
Nicholas (Largest city: Carlisle)
Ohio (Largest city: Beaver Dam)
Powell (Largest city: Stanton)
Rowan (Largest city: Morehead)
Simpson (Largest city: Franklin)
Trigg (Largest city: Cadiz)
Trimble (Largest city: Bedford)
Union (Largest city: Morganfield)
Webster (Largest city: Providence)
Wolfe (Largest city: Campton)

By congressional district
Bush won 5 of 6 congressional districts. Each candidate won a district held by the other party.

Electors 

Technically the voters of Kentucky cast their ballots for electors: representatives to the Electoral College. Kentucky is allocated 8 electors because it has 6 congressional districts and 2 senators. All candidates who appear on the ballot or qualify to receive write-in votes must submit a list of 8 electors, who pledge to vote for their candidate and his or her running mate. Whoever wins the majority of votes in the state is awarded all 8 electoral votes. Their chosen electors then vote for president and vice president. Although electors are pledged to their candidate and running mate, they are not obligated to vote for them. An elector who votes for someone other than his or her candidate is known as a faithless elector.

The electors of each state and the District of Columbia met on December 18, 2000 to cast their votes for president and vice president. The Electoral College itself never meets as one body. Instead the electors from each state and the District of Columbia met in their respective capitols.

The following were the members of the Electoral College from the state. All were pledged to and voted for George W. Bush and Dick Cheney:
George S. Beard
William S. Farish Jr
Robert B. Fearing
Connie S. Hayes
G. Richard Noss Jr.
A. Douglas Reece
Michael A. Shea
Larry Joe Walden

References 

Kentucky
2000 Kentucky elections
2000